Portinari may refer to:

 Beatrice Portinari (1266–1290), muse of Dante
 Candido Portinari (1903–1962), Brazilian painter
 Giovanni Portinari (fl.1508-1572), Anglo-Italian military engineer
 Tommaso Portinari (c.1424–1501), Florentine banker
 Portinari Triptych, a painting by Hugo van der Goes 
 Portinari Chapel, in the Basilica of Sant'Eustorgio, Milan

Italian-language surnames